Ellis Louis Marsalis Jr. (November 14, 1934 – April 1, 2020) was an American jazz pianist and educator. Active since the late 1940s, Marsalis came to greater attention in the 1980s and 1990s as the patriarch of the musical Marsalis family, when sons Branford and Wynton became popular jazz musicians.

Early life 
Born in New Orleans, Louisiana, Marsalis was the son of Florence Marie (née Robertson) and Ellis Marsalis Sr., a businessman and social activist. Marsalis and his wife Dolores Ferdinand Marsalis had six sons: Branford, Wynton, Ellis III, Delfeayo, Mboya, and Jason. Branford, Wynton, Delfeayo, and Jason also became jazz musicians. Ellis III is a poet and photographer.

Marsalis played saxophone during high school but switched to piano while studying classical music at Dillard University, graduating in 1955. He later attended graduate school at Loyola University New Orleans. In the 1950s and 1960s he worked with Ed Blackwell, Cannonball Adderley, Nat Adderley, and Al Hirt. During the 1970s, he taught at the New Orleans Center for Creative Arts. His students have included Terence Blanchard, Harry Connick Jr., Donald Harrison, Kent Jordan, Marlon Jordan, and Nicholas Payton.

Musical career 
Marsalis recorded nearly twenty of his own albums and was featured on many discs with such musicians as David "Fathead" Newman, Eddie Harris, Marcus Roberts, and Courtney Pine. As a teacher, he encouraged his students to learn from history while also making discoveries in music on their own. "We don't teach jazz, we teach students," he once said about his ability to teach jazz improvisation. As a leading educator at the New Orleans Center for Creative Arts, the University of New Orleans, and Xavier University of Louisiana, Marsalis influenced the careers of countless musicians, as well as his four musician sons: Wynton, Branford, Delfeayo and Jason. Marsalis retired from UNO in 2001. In May 2007, Marsalis received an honorary doctorate from Tulane University for his contributions to jazz and musical education.

Awards 
Marsalis was inducted into the Louisiana Music Hall of Fame in 2018. The Ellis Marsalis Center for Music at Musicians' Village in New Orleans is named in his honor. In 2010, The Marsalis family released a live album titled Music Redeems, which was recorded at The John F. Kennedy Center for the Performing Arts in Washington, D.C., as part of the Duke Ellington Jazz Festival. All proceeds from the sale of the album go directly to the Ellis Marsalis Center for Music.

Marsalis was a fraternity brother of Phi Beta Sigma and Phi Mu Alpha Sinfonia. In 2015, Marsalis was named Phi Mu Alpha Sinfonia's 24th Man of Music, their highest honor given to a member, for advancing the cause of music in America through performance, composition or any other musical activity. In 2018, Marsalis was awarded an honorary doctorate of music from Berklee College of Music during its 50th annual High School Jazz Festival.

Death
On April 1, 2020, Marsalis died at the age of 85 from pneumonia brought on by COVID-19. Municipal pandemic safety measures precluded a traditional jazz funeral procession. The short documentary film titled Death Is Our Business by Frontline briefly covered the situation when investigating the pandemic's effects on the New Orleans funeral industry.

Personal life
Marsalis and his wife were Catholic and raised all their children in the faith. The youngest of his sons is Mboya Kenyatta Marsalis, who is diagnosed with autism and is cared for by his brother Delfeayo since their father's death. Their mother, Dolores, died in 2017.

Marsalis and his sons were group recipients of the 2011 NEA Jazz Masters Award.

Discography

As leader

 1985 Syndrome
 1985 Homecoming with Eddie Harris (Spindletop)
 1986 Piano in E
 1989 A Night at Snug Harbor, New Orleans (Somethin' Else)
 1990 Ellis Marsalis Trio (Blue Note)
 1991 Jazzy Wonderland (Columbia)
 1991 Heart of Gold (Columbia)
 1993 Whistle Stop (Columbia)
 1994 Joe Cool's Blues with Wynton Marsalis (Columbia)
 1996 Loved Ones  with Branford Marsalis (Columbia)
 1998 Twelve's It (Sony)
 1999 Duke in Blue (Sony)
 2000 Afternoon Session (Music in the Vines/Sonoma Jazz)
 2005 Ruminations in New York
 2008 An Open Letter to Thelonious (Elm)
 2011 A New Orleans Christmas Carol (Elm)
 2012 Pure Pleasure for the Piano with Makoto Ozone (ECM)
 2013 On the First Occasion (Elm)
 2017 Live at Jazzfest 2017
 2018 The Ellis Marsalis Quintet Plays the Music of Ellis Marsalis

As sideman or guest

With American Jazz Quintet
 1987 From Bad to Badder
 1996 In the Beginning

With Branford Marsalis
 1986 Royal Garden Blues
 2003 Romare Bearden Revealed

With Delfeayo Marsalis
 1997 Musashi
 2014 The Last Southern Gentlemen

With Wynton Marsalis
 1981 Wynton Marsalis
 1982 Fathers and Sons
 1986 J Mood
 1990 Standard Time, Vol. 3: The Resolution of Romance

With Marsalis family
2002 Marsalis Family: A Jazz Celebration
 2010 Music Redeems

With Irvin Mayfield
 1998 Irvin Mayfield
 2001 How Passion Falls
 2008 Love Songs, Ballads, and Standards
 2011 A Love Letter to New Orleans

With Kermit Ruffins
 1992 World on a String
 1996 Hold on Tight

With Dave Young
 1995 Two by Two
 1996 Two by Two Vol. 2
 1996 Side by Side Vol. 3

With others
 1958 Boogie Live ...1958, Ed Blackwell
 1962 In the Bag, Nat Adderley
 1984 Friends, Steve Masakowski
 1987 King Midas & the Golden Touch, Michael Caine
 1989 Have You Heard?, Rich Matteson
 1990 Return to the Wide Open Spaces, David "Fathead" Newman with Cornell Dupree
 1990 Solos (1940), Art Tatum
 1991 As Serenity Approaches, Marcus Roberts
 1992 25, Harry Connick Jr.
 1996 In the Sweet Bye and Bye, Preservation Hall Jazz Band
 1996 Next Generation, Harold Battiste
 1996 Suite Memories, Gerald Wilson
 1996 Ways of Warmdaddy, Wessell Anderson
 2006 Marsalis Music Honors Series: Jimmy Cobb, Jimmy Cobb
 2006 The Sonet Blues Story: 1977, Snooks Eaglin
 2008 Jazz for Peanuts, David Benoit
 2008 Simply Grand, Irma Thomas
 2009 Say It Plain, Scotty Barnhart
 2015 A Very Swingin' Basie Christmas!, Count Basie Orchestra

See also
Deaths in 2020
List of deaths from the COVID-19 pandemic

References

External links

NPR's Jazz Profiles: Ellis Marsalis
 
NAMM Oral History Interview March 21, 2015

1934 births
2020 deaths
20th-century American pianists
African-American jazz musicians
American jazz pianists
American male pianists
Blue Note Records artists
Columbia Records artists
Jazz musicians from New Orleans
21st-century American pianists
20th-century American male musicians
21st-century American male musicians
American male jazz musicians
Deaths from the COVID-19 pandemic in Louisiana
Dillard University alumni
Loyola University New Orleans alumni
University of New Orleans faculty
Xavier University of Louisiana faculty
Marsalis family
African-American Catholics
African-American pianists
21st-century African-American musicians